Pteleopsis barbosae is a species of plant in the Combretaceae family. It is endemic to Mozambique.

References

Flora of Mozambique
barbosaae
Data deficient plants
Endemic flora of Mozambique
Taxonomy articles created by Polbot
Taxobox binomials not recognized by IUCN